Christoph de Vries (born 4 December 1974) is a German politician of the Christian Democratic Union (CDU) who has been serving as a member of the Bundestag from the state of Hamburg since 2017.

Political career 
From 2011 bis 2015, De Vries served as a member of the State Parliament of Hamburg, where he was his parliamentary group’s on family policy. Since 2016, he has been one of the deputy chairpersons of the CDU in Hamburg, under the leadership of chairman Roland Heintze.

De Vries became a member of the Bundestag in the 2017 German federal election, representing the Hamburg-Mitte district. He is a member of the Committee for Home Affairs. In this capacity, he serves as his parliamentary group’s rapporteur on religious groups. Since 2022, he has also been a member of the Parliamentary Oversight Panel (PKGr), which provides parliamentary oversight of Germany’s intelligence services BND, BfV and MAD.

Political positions 
In 2020, De Vries opposed plans to introduce a mandatory quota aimed at achieving equal representation of women within the CDU’s regional and national governing bodies by 2025.

Ahead of the Christian Democrats’ leadership election in 2021, De Vries publicly endorsed Friedrich Merz to succeed Annegret Kramp-Karrenbauer as the party’s chair.

References

External links 

  
 Bundestag biography 

1974 births
Living people
People educated at the Sankt-Ansgar-Schule
University of Hamburg alumni
Members of the Bundestag for Hamburg
Members of the Bundestag 2017–2021
Members of the Bundestag for the Christian Democratic Union of Germany
Members of the Bundestag 2021–2025